Unstrut-Hainich-Kreis I is an electoral constituency (German: Wahlkreis) represented in the Landtag of Thuringia. It elects one member via first-past-the-post voting. Under the current constituency numbering system, it is designated as constituency 8. It covers the northwestern part of Unstrut-Hainich-Kreis.

Unstrut-Hainich-Kreis I was created for the 1994 state election. Since 2019, it has been represented by Jonas Urbach of the Christian Democratic Union (CDU).

Geography
As of the 2019 state election, Unstrut-Hainich-Kreis I covers the northwestern part of Unstrut-Hainich-Kreis, specifically the municipalities of Anrode, Dünwald, Menteroda, Mühlhausen/Thüringen (excluding Bollstedt, Grabe, Höngeda und Seebach), Rodeberg, Südeichsfeld, and Unstruttal.

Members
The constituency has been held by the Christian Democratic Union since its creation in 1994. Its first representative was Thomas Kretschmer, who served from 1994 to 2009, followed by Elke Holzapfel (2009–2019) and Jonas Urbach (2019–present).

Election results

2019 election

2014 election

2009 election

2004 election

1999 election

1994 election

References

Electoral districts in Thuringia
1994 establishments in Germany
Unstrut-Hainich-Kreis
Constituencies established in 1994